The Tour of Germany is a nordic combined event first established in Germany for the 2006-07 Nordic Combined World Cup season by the International Ski Federation.

Initially scheduled to include events in Oberhof, Ruhpolding, and Schonach from December 30, 2006 to January 6, 2007, they were changed to warm weather conditions.

The top three positions for the tour were Manninen, Haseney, and Gottwald

External links
2006-07 FIS Tour of Germany Nordic combined results

2006 in Nordic combined
2007 in Nordic combined
Nordic combined competitions in Germany